Air Commodore Joseph Aidan MacCarthy,  (19 March 1913 – 11 October 1995) was an Irish doctor of the Royal Air Force and a prisoner of war to the Japanese during the Second World War. He survived the atomic bombing of Nagasaki in 1945.

Early life

Aidan MacCarthy was born on 19 March 1913, in the town of Castletownbere, Beara Peninsula, County Cork, Ireland, to Denis Florence MacCarthy and Julia (née Murphy). He was one of ten children; five boys and five girls. He was the sixth child and lived in an apartment above the family business, MacCarthy's Bar, established by his grandfather, Michael McCarthy.

His parents owned land and businesses in the area. He attended Clongowes Wood School and University College Cork. He graduated with a medical degree in 1938. He was unable to obtain employment as a doctor in Ireland so he moved to the United Kingdom, working first in Wales, then in London. 

It was there he met two former classmates from his medical school and, after a night of drinking with them, decided to join the British armed forces as a medical officer. Which service (the Royal Navy or the Royal Air Force) was decided for him by a coin toss made by a nightclub hostess in the early hours of the morning.

RAF career

In 1940, he was posted to France and was evacuated from Dunkirk where he attended wounded Allied soldiers while under fire from German aircraft. In September 1940, he was promoted to flight lieutenant.

The following year he was awarded the George Medal for his part in the rescue of the crew of a crashed and burning Wellington bomber at RAF Honington. The aircraft had crash landed after its undercarriage had failed to lower and it came to rest on the airfields bomb dump, where it caught fire. Together with Group Captain John Astley Gray, MacCarthy entered the burning wreck and rescued two crewmen, but were unable to save the pilot. Gray was badly burned during the rescue; MacCarthy was also burned, but less seriously.

Posted to the Far East in 1941, MacCarthy was captured by the Japanese in Sumatra. The prison ship transporting Allied prisoners to Japan was sunk by a US submarine. MacCarthy had to do the best he could for his patients whilst splashing around in the South China Sea.

After being initially rescued by a Japanese destroyer the crew then started to throw rescued prisoners overboard and the remaining prisoners on the destroyer jumped back into the sea and clambered back on the wreckage.

A Japanese fishing boat pulled him out of the sea and transported him to Japan. There, he cared for Allied prisoners of war who were forced to work in horrific conditions. To the Japanese ear 'MacCarthy' and 'MacArthur' were indistinguishable. The Japanese assumed that MacCarthy must be a close blood relative of the American commander. Therefore, whenever MacCarthy answered his name, he was struck on the forehead. This may have contributed to his developing a brain clot in later life. He was in charge of a working party in Nagasaki when the atomic bomb was dropped on that city on 9 August 1945. The prisoners had previously been warned, by secret radio, to take cover at a particular time of day without being given any further details. When the war ended, when some Australian ex-prisoners were attempting to lynch their Japanese captors, MacCarthy locked the Japanese guards in a cell and threw the key into the sea.

MacCarthy was the senior Allied serviceman in Japan at the Japanese surrender.

In 1946, MacCarthy was appointed an Officer of the Order of the British Empire. In 1948, he was promoted to substantive rank of squadron leader, having held the rank of acting squadron leader since 1940.

MacCarthy retired from the RAF in 1971 with the rank of Air Commodore, the highest rank available to non-combatant officers.

Later years

MacCarthy later practiced medicine in southern England. In 1979 he published an account of his wartime ordeal, titled A Doctor's War.

Death and legacy
He died in Northwood, London on 11 October 1995.

In July 2017, Prince Harry formally named a new RAF medical centre, the Aidan MacCarthy Medical centre, at RAF Honington in his honour.

References

External links
 Irish Identity on Dr MacCarthy 

Royal Air Force Medical Service officers
Royal Air Force personnel of World War II
World War II prisoners of war held by Japan
People from County Cork
People educated at Clongowes Wood College
1913 births
1995 deaths
Alumni of University College Cork
20th-century Irish medical doctors